Nicolas Hosch was a Luxembourgish syndicalist labor leader, who served as the General Commissioner of the Lëtzebuerger Scouten.

In 1979, Hosch was awarded the 136th Bronze Wolf, the only distinction of the World Organization of the Scout Movement, awarded by the World Scout Committee for exceptional services to world Scouting, at the World Scout Conference in Birmingham in 1979, becoming the first Luxembourger to be honored with this Scout distinction.

References

External links

Recipients of the Bronze Wolf Award
Year of birth missing
Scouting and Guiding in Luxembourg